Abaru Rural District is a rural district (dehestan) in the Central District of Hamadan County, Hamadan Province, Iran. At the 2006 census, its population was 6,329, in 1,486 families. The rural district has 6 villages.

References 

Rural Districts of Hamadan Province
Hamadan County